Barium hydride is a chemical compound with the chemical formula .

Preparation and structure
Barium hydride can be prepared by dissolving elemental barium with hydrogen at temperatures between 150-200 °C:

Reactions
Barium hydride reacts with oxygen and water. It is easily explosive when it is mixed with a solid oxidant such as a halide or chromate.

References

Barium compounds
Hydrides